Thedi Vandha Selvam is a 1958 Indian Tamil-language drama film produced and directed by P. Neelakantan. The film stars S. S. Rajendran, Rajasulochana and B. Saroja Devi. It was released on 16 July 1958 and emerged a box office success.

Plot

Cast 
Credits adapted from The Hindu:
 S. S. Rajendran
 Rajasulochana
 B. Saroja Devi
 V. K. Ramasamy
 T. S. Balaiah
 T. K. Ramachandran
 Kuladeivam Rajagopal
 T. P. Muthulakshmi
 P. R. Mangalam
 Lakshmiprabha
 A. Karunanidhi
 D. Balasubramaniam
 M. A. Ganapathi
 P. S. Seethalakshmi
 P. S. Gnanam

Production 
P. Neelakantan produced and directed Thedi Vandha Selvam under his production company Arasu Pictures. The story and dialogues were written by M. S. Solaimalai, cinematography was handled by V. Ramamurthy and editing by V. P. Natarajan.

Soundtrack 
The music was composed by T. G. Lingappa and the lyrics were penned by Thanjai N. Ramaiah Dass, A. Maruthakasi, Pattukkottai Kalyanasundaram and M. K. Athmanathan. The songs "Panguni Poi Chithirai Vandhaa" and "Pakkathile Irruppey" were popular with audience. The song "Jallikattu Kaalai" was released on 78 RPM record only and was not included in the film.

Release and reception 
Thedi Vandha Selvam was released on 16 July 1958. The Indian Express wrote, "Admirable in technical values the film offers more than average entertainment". According to historian Randor Guy, the film was a box office success mainly due to praise for the music and the performances of Rajendran, Ramachandran, Ramasamy and Balaiah.

References

External links 
 

1950s Tamil-language films
1958 drama films
1958 films
Films directed by P. Neelakantan
Films scored by T. G. Lingappa
Indian drama films